Danny Boy is the title of a song often associated with Irish people and culture.

Danny Boy may also refer to:

People
 Danny Boy Collins (born 1967), English professional wrestler
 Danny Boy (rapper) (born 1968), rap/hip hop artist
 Danny Boy (singer) (born 1977), R&B/soul singer
 Danny-Boy Hatchard (born 1991), UK actor

Music 
 Danny Boy et ses Pénitents, a French rock and roll group of the 1960s
 Danny Boy: The Life & Times of a Kid in the D (album) 2014 rap album by Hush
 "Danny Boy", a song by Rufus Wainwright from the album Rufus Wainwright

Film 
 Danny Boy (1934 film), a British musical film
 Danny Boy (1941 film), a British drama film
 Danny Boy (1946 film), an American film
 Danny Boy, a 2010 animated short directed and written by Marek Skrobecki
Danny Boy (2020 film), a British made-for-television film about the Battle of Danny Boy

Other uses
 Battle of Danny Boy, a battle in Iraq 2004 involving Princess of Wales's Royal Regiment

See also

A boy named Danny
Broadsword calling Danny Boy (disambiguation)
Danny Boy plus three (album) 1996 record
DannyBoyStyles, Grammy award-winning record producer
Danny Bhoy (born 1975) Scottish comedian
Danny Boyd (born 1958) U.S. American football player
Daniel Boyle (disambiguation)
Daniel Boyd (disambiguation)